Kawngkan is a village in Homalin Township, Hkamti District, in the Sagaing Region of northwestern Burma. It is located near the border with India.

References

External links
Maplandia World Gazetteer

Populated places in Hkamti District
Homalin Township